The European Union of the Deaf (EUD) is a supraorganization comprising each respective National Association of the Deaf of the member states of the European Union. The EUD is a nonprofit organization founded in 1985 and is a Regional Co-operating Member of the World Federation of the Deaf (WFD), a full member of the European Disability Forum (EDF) and has a participatory status with the Council of Europe (CoE).

History

List of presidents
 2013 – present: Dr Markku Jokinen
 2007–2013: Berglind Stefánsdóttir
 2005–2007: Helga Stevens
 1990–2005: Knud Søndergaard
 1989–1989: Jeff Labes
 1985–1989: Jock Young

Members

Full members

See also
 WFD - World Federation of the Deaf
 Languages of the European Union

References

External links 
 eud.eu, official EUD website

1985 establishments in Europe
Deafness organizations
International organizations based in Europe
Non-profit organizations based in Europe
Organizations established in 1985